"Official Ireland" is a term widely used in the Republic of Ireland to denote The Establishment. It refers to the most powerful figures in the media, the Catholic Church, and the political parties, who control the national debate.

It generally denotes support for constitutional Irish republicanism, private property, the Catholic Church, libertarianism in economics, Gaelicisation and Irish language revival, and rural life.

History
The term was first used by footballer and journalist Eamon Dunphy.

Dr. Elaine Byrne has said "Official Ireland is predominantly male, over 50 and earners over €100,000. For the most part, it includes the speakers at this MacGill summer school and those that attend it. Official Ireland is characterised by the sameness of people in positions of power which means a uniformity of decision-making. This closed-minded conformism dismisses and belittles anyone who opposes the group consensus."

David McWilliams has repeatedly criticised "Official Ireland"'s response to the Great Recession.

Jonathan Sugarman used the term in 2017.

References

Ethnic groups in Ireland
Political terminology
Oligarchy
Politics of the Republic of Ireland